Local elections were held in the Kingdom of Romania in 1936.

References 

Local election, 1936
Local election, 1936
Romania